The Coliseo of Havana was the first theatre built in Havana, constructed on January 20, 1775. It was built near the Alameda de Paula between Calles Acosta, Oficios, and Luz, in Old Havana.

The theatre was the site of the first ever opera performed in Havana. The opera was Didone abbandonata, a work that featured a libretto by Pietro Metastasio.

The building had 4 stories of box seating, it contained seating on the ground floor, a stage, and services.

Coliseum was in poor condition and closed  in 1788. A repair was carried out on it and, later, in 1803, it reopened its doors under the name El Principal. The theatre continued popularity until it was heavily damamged by a cyclone in 1846. However, there was a general repair project in 1847. In an 1853 map of Havana, the 'Teatro Principal' is shown as "destruido."

See also

 La Alameda de Paula, Havana
 Palacio del Segundo Cabo
 Antonio Fernández de Trebejos y Zaldívar
 Palacio de los Capitanes Generales

References

External links

Archive of Historic Havana

Buildings and structures in Havana
Neoclassical architecture in Cuba
Architecture in Havana